Mark Harlan is the athletic director at the University of Utah. Prior to taking the position at Utah, he was the athletic director at the University of South Florida.

College
Harlan is a graduate of the University of Arizona, where he earned a bachelor's degree in political science and a master's degree in education.

Career
Harlan has held sports administration positions at the University of South Florida, San Jose State, Northern Colorado, UCLA, and the University of Arizona. Spent five years as athletic director at the University of South Florida. In 2015-2016 USF men's basketball was in an academic scandal. USF released a statement that in part read they and the NCAA “are working together to investigate and resolve an inquiry into potential violations of NCAA bylaws and university standards….” Harlan was criticized for his ethical character and mismanagement.
In 2016, he was also publicly  criticized for his debacle of handling USF’s pitch to join the Big 12 conference. In their presentation they misspelled the word “research” as “reasearch”. Harlan left USF to become the athletic director of the University of Utah in June 2018.

Family
Harlan and his wife, Carolyn, have two children, Savannah and Austin.

See also
 List of NCAA Division I athletic directors

References

External links
 South Florida profile

Living people
University of Arizona alumni
South Florida Bulls athletic directors
Utah Utes athletic directors
Year of birth missing (living people)